Anta Dembele (born 15 June 1994) is a Senegalese footballer who plays as a defender for US Parcelles Assainies and the Senegal women's national team.

International career
Dembele capped for Senegal at senior level during the 2018 Africa Women Cup of Nations qualification.

References

External links

1994 births
Living people
Senegalese women's footballers
Women's association football defenders
Senegal women's international footballers